In arithmetic, a quotient (from  'how many times', pronounced ) is a quantity produced by the division of two numbers. The quotient has widespread use throughout mathematics, and is commonly referred to as the integer part of a division (in the case of Euclidean division), or as a fraction or a ratio (in the case of proper division). In the second sense, a quotient is simply the ratio of a dividend to its divisor.

Notation

The quotient is most frequently encountered as two numbers, or two variables, divided by a horizontal line.  The words "dividend" and "divisor" refer to each individual part, while the word "quotient" refers to the whole.

Integer part definition
The quotient is also less commonly defined as the greatest whole number of times a divisor may be subtracted from a dividend—before making the remainder negative. For example, the divisor 3 may be subtracted up to 6 times from the dividend 20, before the remainder becomes negative:
 20 − 3 − 3 − 3 − 3 − 3 − 3 ≥ 0,
while
 20 − 3 − 3 − 3 − 3 − 3 − 3 − 3 < 0.
In this sense, a quotient is the integer part of the ratio of two numbers.

Quotient of two integers

A rational number can be defined as the quotient of two integers (as long as the denominator is non-zero).

A more detailed definition goes as follows:

 A real number r is rational, if and only if it can be expressed as a quotient of two integers with a nonzero denominator. A real number that is not rational is irrational.

Or more formally: 

The existence of irrational numbers—numbers that are not a quotient of two integers—was first discovered in geometry, in such things as the ratio of the diagonal to the side in a square.

More general quotients 
Outside of arithmetic, many branches of mathematics have borrowed the word "quotient" to describe structures built by breaking larger structures into pieces. Given a set with an equivalence relation defined on it, a "quotient set" may be created which contains those equivalence classes as elements. A quotient group may be formed by breaking a group into a number of similar cosets, while a quotient space may be formed in a similar process by breaking a vector space into a number of similar linear subspaces.

See also
 Product (mathematics)
 Quotient category
 Quotient graph
Integer division
 Quotient module
 Quotient object
 Quotient of a formal language, also left and right quotient
 Quotient ring
 Quotient set
 Quotient space (topology)
 Quotient type
 Quotition and partition

References

Real numbers
Division (mathematics)